Minuscule 2284 (in the Gregory-Aland numbering), ε359 (von Soden), is a Greek minuscule manuscript of the New Testament, on parchment. Palaeographically it has been assigned to the 13th century. The manuscript has complex contents. Gregory labelled it by siglum 704. Scrivener labelled it by 886e.

Description 

The codex contains the text of the four Gospels on two volumes, 324 parchment leaves (size ).

The text is written in one column per page, 18-21 lines per page.

The first pages in Matthew have a Latin translation on the margin.

Text 

Kurt Aland the Greek text of the codex did not place in any Category.

According to the Wisse's Profile Method it represents mixed Byzantine text, related to the textual family Kr in Luke 1, Luke 10, and Luke 20.

History 

Scrivener and Gregory dated the manuscript to the 13th century. Currently the manuscript is dated by the INTF to the 13th century.

It was added to the list of New Testament manuscript by Gregory (704). It was renumbered by Aland as 2284.

Formerly it was housed in London, in Quaritch (Catalogue 94, No. 145).

Actually the manuscript is housed at the John Rylands University Library (Ms. Gr. 18) in Manchester.

See also 

 List of New Testament minuscules
 Biblical manuscript
 Textual criticism

References

Further reading 

 

Greek New Testament minuscules
13th-century biblical manuscripts